Bamble Cellulosefabrikk was a pulp mill in Herre, Bamble, Norway.

It was established in 1888. Cellulose expert Henrik Christian Fredrik Størmer was behind the construction. It changed its name to Herre Fabrikker in 1946, was bought by Follum Fabrikker in 1962 and closed down in 1978.

References

Manufacturing companies established in 1888
Manufacturing companies disestablished in 1978
Manufacturing companies of Norway
Companies based in Telemark
Bamble
Defunct pulp and paper companies
Pulp and paper mills in Norway
1978 disestablishments in Norway
Norwegian companies established in 1888